Adriana E. Ramírez is an American writer and critic of Mexican and Colombian descent. Her writing addresses the history and culture of violence in Colombia, Mexico, and the United States.

In 2015, she won the PEN/Fusion Emerging Writers Prize for Dead Boys. The manuscript was subsequently published as Dead Boys: A Memoir in 2016 by Little A, an imprint of Amazon Publishing. Her debut full-length work of nonfiction, The Violence, was acquired by Scribner and is forthcoming. In 2019, she received a grant of $10,000 from investing in professional artists, a joint project of the Pittsburgh Foundation and the Heinz Endowments; she also received that year's established artist Carol R. Brown Creative Achievement Award from the Pittsburgh Foundation. The grant describes The Violence as "a book on the history of violence in the Americas, from Pittsburgh to Colombia and back, blending family oral histories with larger national narratives."

She co-founded the literary journal Aster(ix) with Angie Cruz in 2013 and continues to serve as publisher. Beginning in 2016, she served as a critic-at-large for the Los Angeles Times. She competed on Jeopardy! in 2022, an experience she subsequently wrote about for The Atlantic.

References 

Living people
Year of birth missing (living people)
Los Angeles Times people
21st-century American writers
21st-century American women writers